Paignton Windmill, also known as Fernicombe Windmill, is a late 18th-century windmill situated on the outskirts of the town of Paignton, Devon, England. It is a Grade II Listed Building, and lies in a partially ruinous state.

References 

Grade II listed buildings in Devon
Windmills in Devon
Buildings and structures in Paignton